The Director General Armed Forces Medical Services (DGAFMS) is the head of the Armed Forces Medical Services of the Indian Armed Forces. A three-star rank medical flag officer, the DGAFMS is equivalent to Army Commanders and the Defence Secretary. The DGAFMS is the advisor to the Chief of Defence Staff (CDS) and the Minister of Defence on the medical requirements of the Armed Forces.

History
In March 1947, an Armed Forces Medical Services and Research Integration Committee was formed by the Government of India. The committee, headed by Dr. Bidhan Chandra Roy, subsequently Chief Minister of West Bengal until 1962, was tasked with examining the integration of medical services and research of the three branches of the Armed Forces. The committee recommended that the Indian Armed Forces Medical Services would have a supreme controller designated Director General of the Armed Forces Medical Services in the rank of Lieutenant General/Vice Admiral/Air Marshal.

In September 1948, the medical services of the Royal Indian Navy, the Indian Army and the Royal Indian Air Force were integrated into the Armed Forces Medical Service (AFMS). The AFMS consists of the Army Medical Corps (AMC), the Army Dental Corps (AD Corps) and the Military Nursing Service (MNS). The Director of Medical Services at Army Headquarters, Lieutenant General K. S. Master, was appointed the first Director General Armed Forces Medical Services to head the service. The DGAFMS would be responsible to the Ministry of Defence for overall medical policy matters related to the Armed Forces.

Appointees

See also
 Army Medical Corps (India)

References

Indian military appointments
Military medical organizations